Doina Rotaru (born 14 September 1951, Bucharest) is a Romanian composer best known for orchestral and chamber works.

Biography 
Marilena Doinița Rotaru was born in Bucharest and studied with Tiberiu Olah at the Bucharest Conservatory in Bucharest from 1970-1975. In 1991, she continued her studies with Theo Loevendie in Amsterdam. In 1991 she also took a position as a professor at the National University of Music, and has served several times as a guest lecturer in Darmstadt, Germany and the Gaudeamus Composers Workshop in Amsterdam. Her music has been commissioned and performed internationally in Europe, Asia and the Americas. She is a member of the Romanian Composers Union.

In 1986, Rotaru published an article with Liviu Comes on the counterpoint techniques of Johann Sebastian Bach and Giovanni Pierluigi da Palestrina in Editura Muzicala.

Prizes and awards
Seven prizes from the Romanian Composers Union (1981, 1986, 1989, 1990, 1994, 1997, 2001) 
Prize of the Romanian Academy of Arts and Sciences (1986) 
First Prize in the GEDOK Competition in Mannheim (1994, for Symphony II).

Selected works
Besides orchestral and chamber works, Rotaru also composers choral and instructional pieces. Selected works include:

Concerto for clarinet and orchestra, 1984 
Symphony I for large orchestra, 1985
Métabole II for clarinet and orchestra, 2001
Sonata for cello, 1978
String Quartet No. 1, 1981
Trias for mezzo-soprano, flute, piano, 1999
The Crossroads of the Poppies for piano, 1980
Sonatina for piano 1981

A number of recordings of Rotaru's music are available, including:

Symphony II. Ludovic Bács/Radio Bucharest Orchestra (Editura Muzicala: EM 007)
Over time. Yoshikazu Iwamoto, shakuhachi; Pierre-Yves Artaud, bass flute (Editura Muzicala: EM 1002)
Concerto, ‘Seven Levels to the Sky’. Daniel Kientzy, saxophones; Emil Simon/Cluj-Napoca Philharmonic (Nova Musica: NMCD 5105)

References

External links 
 Artistic biography and list of works
 Biographical sketch and list of works at The Living Composers Project.

Romanian classical composers
20th-century classical composers
21st-century classical composers
Women classical composers
Musicians from Bucharest
Living people
1951 births
National University of Music Bucharest alumni
20th-century women composers
21st-century women composers